Nova is a Spanish television channel operated by Atresmedia. The network runs 24 hours a day in the Spanish language. The service is aimed at women, with the schedule reflecting this aim. Lifestyle programmes such as cooking shows are normally screened during the day. In the evening, films and some series are shown, and around midnight, Poker is screened. The network is available on digital terrestrial television (TDT as it is known in Spain) as well as via cable and satellite.

History
The channel was launched as Antena.Nova in 2005 together with Antena.Neox, this with the aim of strengthening the Antena 3 brand in the recently launched digital terrestrial television in Spain. Antena.Nova was the first Spanish DTT channel aimed at a female audience.

In 2006 Antena 3 and CBS Corporation signed an agreement to broadcast content produced by CBS, Showtime and UPN, which would be programmed on Antena.Neox, Antena.Nova and Antena 3 until the Showtime and UPN brands were implemented on the Spanish television replacing Neox and Nova, however, the change was not carried out in the end due to the distribution of broadcasting rights with other Spanish channels. However, Antena 3 obtained the rights to broadcast future productions of CBS Corporation.

On January 1, 2009 Antena.Nova was renamed as Nova 9 in order to associate the channel with that logical channel number on digital terrestrial television. Finally, on August 6, 2010, it adopted the current name. In 2011 the channel began to have competition after the launch of Divinity, owned by Mediaset España.

In May 2014, the channel added docuseries and movies to its programming due to the closure of Nitro, Xplora and la Sexta 3.

In 2017 the channel incorporated in its grid turkish television dramas to complement the offer of Latin American soap operas. 

In June 2020, Nova managed to be the most watched thematic channel on Spanish DTT. In July 2020, it achieved its best figure by achieving 3.0% of the average monthly audience.

Programming
Nova's programming is aimed at a female audience between 18 and 44 years old. The grill is distinguished by the broadcast of series, Latin American and Turkish soap operas, movies, and decoration and cooking programs.

References

External links
 Official site

Television stations in Spain
Atresmedia Televisión
RTL Group
Women's interest channels
Spanish-language television stations
Television channels and stations established in 2005
2005 establishments in Spain
Atresmedia channels